The Kel-Tec RFB (Rifle, Forward-ejection, Bullpup) is a gas-operated bullpup type semi-automatic rifle, manufactured by Kel-Tec Industries of Florida. At the 2008 SHOT Show held from February 2 to 5 in Las Vegas, Nevada it was declared by Kel-Tec representatives that the RFB rifle would be made available to the public by the 4th quarter of 2008. Later, the Kel-Tec website stated that the  barrel carbine variant would not be shipping until February 2009 due to a change in the production process intended as preventive measures against potential gun control legislation. The rifle first shipped to distributors in the first week of March 2009 and was first seen at the 2007 SHOT Show.

Design details
The RFB is a semi-automatic firearm chambered for 7.62×51mm NATO/.308 Winchester ammunition. The RFB uses metric FAL magazines, which insert straight into the magazine well and do not need to rock into place. It has a short-stroke gas piston operating system. The rifle uses a patented forward-ejection system via a tube placed over the barrel that ejects the spent case forwards, over the handguard of the rifle. Extraction is accomplished by two extractors, each with two axes of rotation. The extractors may move side-to-side to engage the rim of the case, and pivot upwards to extract the spent case after firing.  Empty cases remain in the ejection chute until either the weapon is tilted downwards, the charging handle is operated, or they are pushed out by following cases. Cases drop gently from this chute to the left of the barrel. To avoid sloppy trigger pull typical of firearms modified into bullpups, the RFB uses a floating linkage bar between the sear and the hammer, allowing the sear to remain above the trigger. The weapon is fully ambidextrous, much in the style of the Belgian F2000 rifle. The RFB is delivered without iron sights. A mil-spec Picatinny rail is provided for mounting a wide range of optics and tactical accessories.

The barrel of the RFB is not fully free floated, it instead serves as the rigid "spine" of the weapon, to which all other components are attached (either directly or through other components).

Meanwhile, Kel-Tec has introduced similar bullpup rifles in 5.56mm called the RDB and the M43, released in 2014.

Variants
Kel-Tec has produced at least four versions with differing barrel lengths, weight, overall length, and performance:

 Carbine with an  barrel,
 Hunter variant with  length barrel,
 Target version with either a heavy profile  barrel or  stainless steel barrel, and
 RFB-C with an  barrel meeting the Canadian requirement for non-restricted rifles, exclusively for export to Canada.
As of 2013, all four variants have been publicly released for sale.

See also
List of bullpup firearms

References

External links
 Official Page
 KTOG RFB Forum

 Videos
 Kel Tec RFB being fired

7.62×51mm NATO semi-automatic rifles
Bullpup rifles